Season 1979–80 was the 96th football season in which Dumbarton competed at a Scottish national level, entering the Scottish Football League for the 74th time, the Scottish Cup for the 85th time and the Scottish League Cup for the 33rd time.

Overview 
For the fifth year running, Dumbarton played league football in Division 1, and after a promising start to the campaign, there was a real feeling that promotion could be achieved, particularly with the club topping the division at Christmas.  However, a run of 7 games where only one win was registered, damped spirits, and following a 1-4 defeat to Arbroath, manager Davie Wilson was sacked.  Nevertheless, with John Cushley as caretaker manager, 3 wins in the last 3 matches were sufficient to secure 4th place.

In the Scottish Cup, Dumbarton lost out to fellow Division 1 opponents Ayr United.

Similarly in the League Cup, Dumbarton were to fall at the first hurdle to St Johnstone.

Locally, in the Stirlingshire Cup, Dumbarton had to give second-best to local rivals Clydebank in the semi-final in a penalty shoot out after a drawn match.

Note that at the start of the season, Dumbarton embarked on a tour of Ireland which took in 3 matches, all of which were won.

Results & fixtures

Scottish First Division

Scottish Cup

Scottish League Cup

Stirlingshire Cup

Pre-season and other matches

League table

Player statistics

Squad 

|}

International Cap
Graeme Sinclair was selected to play for the Scottish League team in a friendly match against the League of Ireland on 17 March 1980 played in Dublin (won by the Irish 2-1).

Transfers

Players in

Players out

Reserve team
Dumbarton competed in the Scottish Reserve League First Division (West).

In the Scottish Second XI Cup, Dumbarton lost to Dundee United in the third round, and in the Reserve League Cup, Dumbarton lost to Ayr United, on aggregate, in the first round.

Trivia
  The League match against Motherwell on 29 September marked Ally Brown's 200th appearance for Dumbarton in all national competitions - the 14th Dumbarton player to break the 'double century'.
  The League match against Hearts on 6 October marked Pat McCluskey's 100th appearance for Dumbarton in all national competitions - the 79th Dumbarton player to reach this milestone.
  The League match against Hamilton on 27 October marked Raymond Blair's 100th appearance for Dumbarton in all national competitions - the 80th Dumbarton player to reach this milestone.
  The League match against Motherwell on 1 December marked Brian Gallacher's 100th appearance for Dumbarton in all national competitions - the 81st Dumbarton player to reach this milestone.
  The fee received of £125,000 for Graeme Sharp's transfer to Everton at the end of the season broke the record set by Murdo MacLeod's departure the previous season.
 Manager Davie Wilson resigned on 4 April and Sean Fallon took over as caretaker until the end of the season - at which time he was confirmed as the manager for the next season.

See also
 1979–80 in Scottish football

References

External links
Jim Martin (Dumbarton Football Club Historical Archive)
Joe Rowan (Dumbarton Football Club Historical Archive)
Gerry Findlay (Dumbarton Football Club Historical Archive) 
Joe Kennedy (Dumbarton Football Club Historical Archive)
Scottish Football Historical Archive

Dumbarton F.C. seasons
Scottish football clubs 1979–80 season